The Man from Yesterday is a 1949 British thriller film directed by Oswald Mitchell and starring John Stuart, Henry Oscar and Marie Burke. It was made at Southall Studios.

Cast
 John Stuart as Gerald Amersley 
 Henry Oscar as Julius Rickman 
 Marie Burke as Doris Amersley  
 Gwynneth Vaughan as Doreen Amersley  
 Laurence Harvey as John Matthews  
 Grace Arnold as Mrs. Amersley  
 Lisa Davis as Gloria Amersley 
 Charles Paton as Gardener  
 Keith Shepherd as Parkes  
 John Turnbull as Judge  
 Pauline Winter as Ann

References

Bibliography
 Chibnall, Steve & McFarlane, Brian. The British 'B' Film. Palgrave MacMillan, 2009.

External links

1949 films
British thriller films
1940s thriller films
Films directed by Oswald Mitchell
Films shot at Southall Studios
British black-and-white films
1940s English-language films
1940s British films